The 1993 Island Games on the Isle of Wight was the 3rd edition in which a men's football (soccer) tournament was played at the multi-games competition. It was contested by 8 teams.

Jersey won the tournament for the first time.

Participants

 Isle of Man

Group phase

Group 1

Group 2

Placement play-off matches

7th place match

5th place match

3rd Place Match

Final

Final rankings

Top goalscorers

7 goals
  Adam Greig*

3 goals
 Nielsen*
 Janussen*

* May have scored more

External links
Official 1993 website

1993
Gibraltar in international football
1993–94 in European football
1993
1993–94 in English football
Football in Jersey